Original Christianity may refer to:
the historical Origins of Christianity in the 1st century BC to the 1st century AD
the claims of "original Christianity" restored in Restorationism (Christian primitivism)